Aphantites is a Lower Pennsylvanian  ammonite belonging to the goniatitid family Reticuloceratidae which are characterized by involute subdiscoidal shells  covered by linear or biconvex growth lines that may be crossed by longitudinal lirae, producing a reticulate pattern. Sutures are simple, the ventral lobe double pronged. Related genera include Surenites and Reticuloceras.

References

Aphantites in Paleobiology Database, Surenitinae  8/2/10
 Goniat online, Reticuloceratidae 8/2/10

Goniatitida genera
Reticuloceratidae
Pennsylvanian ammonites